Lyski  is a village in Rybnik County, Silesian Voivodeship, in southern Poland. It is the seat of the gmina (administrative district) called Gmina Lyski. 

The village has a population of 1,800.

References

Lyski